Below is the list of current British records in finswimming. The records are ratified by the British Finswimming Association. 

This list echoes that found on the Monofin: Finswimming In the UK Website. These records are correct as of 1 April 2018.

In December 2017 British Finswimming Association made a decision to maintain the National records separately for adults and juniors in line with CMAS regulations.

Long course metres

Men 

The records listed are correct as of 1 December 2019.

Junior - Boys 
The records listed are correct as of 1 December 2019

Women 
The records listed are correct as of 19 June 2018

Junior - Girls 
The records listed are correct as of 1 April 2019.

Short course metres

Men 

The records listed are correct as of 1 April 2019.

Junior - Boys 

The records listed are correct as of 15 December 2017.

Women 

The records listed are correct as of 1 April 2019.

Junior - Girls 

The records listed are correct as of 1 April 2019.

Notes 

Other notes on these records will be put here when they arise.

References and external links 
 British finswimming association
 Neptune Finswimming Club (Bristol)
 Monofin: Finswimming in the UK
 Age group records in Finswimming

Finswimming in the United Kingdom
British
Finswimming
finswimming